The Selena Gomez & the Scene: Live in Concert was the debut concert tour by American band Selena Gomez & the Scene. Beginning in the fall of 2009, the trek supported the band's debut studio album, Kiss & Tell. The tour primarily reached the United States and England.

Opening acts
JLS (Bethlehem)
Mitchel Musso  (Springfield)

Set list

Tour dates

Festivals and other miscellaneous performances

Cancellations and rescheduled shows

Box office score data

References

External links
 Selena Gomez & the Scene's Official Website

2009 concert tours
2010 concert tours
Selena Gomez & the Scene concert tours